Westgate is the fifth studio album by Australian musician Mark Seymour released in June 2007. The album was described as centred on "everyday heroes", with the title track recounting the tale of a real-life worker who was on duty when Melbourne's West Gate Bridge collapsed on 15 October 1970, killing 35 construction workers. "The Year of the Dog" which was initially written as a football song for the Western Bulldogs football team, became the saga of a friend with a drink problem. The album was named as one of the top 10 albums of the year by the Sunday Herald Sun.

The album's title track had previously been included in a Melbourne Theatre Workers' production, We Built This City, performed at Scienceworks in the suburb of Spotswood in early 2006.

Track listing
(All songs written by Mark Seymour except where indicated)

 "Westgate" – 4:50
 "Tobruk Pin" (Seymour, Geoff Goodfellow) – 2:41
 "Jerusalem" (Steve Earle) – 3:52
 "Love Is a Heavy Load" – 4:18
 "Walk Through Fire" – 4:31
 "The Year of the Dog" – 4:02
 "Hell Broke Free" – 3:43
 "18 Again" – 4:00
 "Master of Spin" – 5:16
 "Feel the Lord" – 4:54
 "Mississauga" – 4:08
 "The Light on the Hill" – 3:34
 "The Stayer" – 3:35 (iTunes bonus track)
 "Monday to Friday" – 3:46 (iTunes bonus track)

Personnel
Mark Seymour - vocals, guitars
 Scott Alpin - keyboards
 Steve Hadley - bass
 Pip Healey - fiddle
 Dave Larkin - lead guitar
 Jake Mason - keyboards
 Cameron McKenzie - guitars
 Nick Higgins - lap steel
 Nick Seymour - bass
 Kit Warhurst - drums
 Chris Wilson - harp
 Lisa Miller - vocals ("Hell Broke Free")

References

2007 albums
Mark Seymour albums